The second government of Giorgi Kvirikashvili was the government (cabinet) of Georgia, with Giorgi Kvirikashvili as its head as the country's Prime Minister from 26 November 2016 to 13 June 2018. The cabinet was formed  after the victory of the incumbent Georgian Dream–Democratic Georgia party in the October 2016 parliamentary election. On 26 November 2016, the new government, which retained most members of the preceding one, was approved by the Parliament of Georgia in the vote of confidence, with 110 votes in favor; 19 members—representing the opposition United National Movement and Alliance of Patriots of Georgia parties—voted against. The government became defunct following Kvirikashvili's resignation on 13 June 2018. It was succeeded by the government of Mamuka Bakhtadze.

Ministers

References 

Government of Georgia (country)
2016 establishments in Georgia (country)
Cabinets established in 2016
2018 disestablishments in Georgia (country)
Cabinets disestablished in 2018